Duvansky District (Dıwan rayonı) is an administrative and municipal district (raion), one of the fifty-four in the Republic of Bashkortostan, Russia. It is located in the north of the republic and borders with Perm Krai in the north, Mechetlinsky District in the northeast and east, Kiginsky District in the southeast, Salavatsky District in the south, Nurimanovsky District in the southwest, Karaidelsky District in the west, and with Askinsky District in the northwest. Its administrative center is the rural locality (a selo) of Mesyagutovo. As of the 2010 Census, the total population of the district was 31,068, with the population of Mesyagutovo accounting for 35.0% of that number.

History
The district was established in 1930.

Administrative and municipal status
Within the framework of administrative divisions, Duvansky District is one of the fifty-four in the Republic of Bashkortostan. The district is divided into thirteen selsoviets, comprising forty-seven rural localities. As a municipal division, the district is incorporated as Duvansky Municipal District. Its thirteen selsoviets are incorporated as thirteen rural settlements within the municipal district. The selo of Mesyagutovo serves as the administrative center of both the administrative and municipal district.

References

Notes

Sources

Districts of Bashkortostan
States and territories established in 1930